Éric Bonjour (born 1973 in Switzerland) is a Swiss politician of the Swiss People's Party.

He has held an MP position at the Cantonal Council of Vaud since 11 March 2007.

Notes and references 

1973 births
Living people
Swiss People's Party politicians